La Poste tunisienne (Arabic : البريد التونسي, French: La Poste tunisienne) is the company responsible for postal service in Tunisia. It also operates banking services within Tunisia as well. The company was founded in 1847, and was admitted to the Universal Postal Union in 1878. The Tunisian Post opened the Caisse d'épargne nationale tunisienne ("Tunisian National Savings Bank") in 1956.

External links
Poste.tn official website

Communications in Tunisia
Companies of Tunisia
Tunisia
Government-owned companies of Tunisia
Companies established in 1847
1847 establishments in Africa
1847 establishments in the Ottoman Empire
19th-century establishments in Tunisia